Doctor in the House is a 1954 British comedy film.

Doctor in the House also refers to:

Doctor in the House (novel)
Doctor in the House (franchise)
Doctor in the House (TV series)

See also
"Doctorin' the House", a song by Coldcut from the album What's That Noise?
House doctor (disambiguation)